PlayMaker Football is an American football simulation produced by PlayMaker Software. The first version of the game was released in 1989 by Broderbund for the Macintosh. It has since been ported to the Microsoft Windows and Palm OS. The most recent versions are 2.4 for the Macintosh and Palm OS platforms and 2.3 for the Microsoft Windows platform.

Summary
PlayMaker Football allows one to take the role of a coach of a team of 30 football players. The coach can create a team using the Team Draft mode of the program, and then design and test plays using the Chalkboard Editor mode. The Chalkboard Editor mode also allows the coach to create artificial intelligence settings for each play, used by the program to determine which play to call on each down of a game. The Game mode allows the coach to play games between two teams, each under the control of a coach or the computer.

PlayMaker Football spawned a small but dedicated community of players on online providers such as America Online and CompuServe. This community is still around today, with several internet sites available for coaches to join organized leagues.

PlayMaker Football 2.0 was released in 1996 for MS-DOS and Microsoft Windows.

Reception
PlayMaker Football 2.1.4 was reviewed by mymac.com in 1997. The reviewers highlighted the realism, sound effects and the community of enthusiasts that were present online.

References

External links 
 PlayMaker Software
 PMFB.Net PlayMaker Football community, including several online leagues

1989 video games
American football video games
Broderbund games
DOS games
Classic Mac OS games
Multiplayer and single-player video games
Video games developed in the United States
Windows games